Narin Channarong (born August 13, 1998) is a Thai professional footballer who plays as a right-winger for Nakhon Ratchasima in the Thai League 1.

External links
 
https://www.livesoccer888.com/thaipremierleague/2017/teams/Thai-Honda-Ladkrabang-FC/Players/Narin-Channarong

1998 births
Living people
Narin Channarong
Association football forwards
Narin Channarong
Narin Channarong
Narin Channarong
Narin Channarong
Narin Channarong
Narin Channarong